Fitzgerald Park or FitzGerald Park may refer to:
 Fitzgerald's Park, Cork city, Ireland
 FitzGerald Park, Kilmallock, Ireland
 Páirc Mhic Gearailt, Fermoy GAA, Cork, Ireland
 Kevin W. Fitzgerald Park, Mission Hill, Boston, Massachusetts, USA

See also
 Fitzgerald Stadium, Killarney, Ireland
 Fitzgerald River National Park, Western Australia